"Rhythm of Love" is a song by Yes. It appeared on the 1987 Big Generator album. It was released repeatedly as a single, alternating as the A-side or B-side of "Love Will Find a Way". It was also remixed many times, though, thus far, only two have seen a legal issue on CD; both appeared on the 1987 CD single, and have not seen an official release elsewhere. Paulinho Da Costa was brought in for percussion overdubs. The song eventually became one of the band's most popular songs and appeared on a number of tours since 1987, eventually becoming the 18th most played song at Yes concerts, appearing 384 times as of 2009.

Cash Box said that "John Anderson's vocals are in top form and bravely guide this tune along a smooth and rockin' path."

A music video of the song, directed by Alex Proyas, also exists.

Chart performance

Live performances

The song was played on the Big Generator, Union, Talk, Open Your Eyes, 35th Anniversary and Royal Affair concert tours.

Throughout the 1987-1988 Big Generator tour, Yes experimented with its introduction, playing it different ways: Early in November 1987, they started the show with the "Almost Like Love" intro, segueing into the "Heart Of The Sunrise" riff, before transitioning into "Rhythm of Love". Other times, they started the song the same way they did on the record, with the flute sample.

Few live versions have been officially issued. One can be found on the box set The Word Is Live.

A version was also performed by Yes Featuring Jon Anderson, Trevor Rabin, Rick Wakeman, with slightly altered lyrics, on both of their tours and was also released on the bands Live At The Apollo album and video in 2018, along with a video on the Mercury Records YouTube Channel.

Official remixes
12" ATCO Records – 0-96722
 1) "Rhythm Of Love" (Dance To The Rhythm Mix)
 2) "Rhythm Of Love" (Move To The Rhythm Mix)
 3) "Rhythm Of Love" (The Rhythm Of Dub)
 4) "City Of Love" (Live Edit)

Promo CD ATCO Records – PR 2089-2
 1) "Rhythm Of Love" (Edit)
 2) "Rhythm Of Love" (Move To The Rhythm Mix)
 3) "Rhythm Of Love" (Dance To The Rhythm Mix)

Notes and references

Yes (band) songs
1987 singles
Songs written by Chris Squire
Songs written by Jon Anderson
Songs written by Trevor Rabin
Song recordings produced by Trevor Horn
Atco Records singles